Qaleh Qazi (also Romanized as Qal‘eh Qāẕī; also known as Qal‘eh-ye Bālā and Qal‘eh) is a village in Mehranrud-e Markazi Rural District, in the Central District of Bostanabad County, East Azerbaijan Province, Iran. At the 2006 census, its population was 474, in 93 families.

References 

Populated places in Bostanabad County